The 2021–22 season was the 72nd season in the existence of Stade Brestois 29 and the club's fourth consecutive season in the top flight of French football. In addition to the domestic league, Brest participated in this season's edition of the Coupe de France.

Players

First-team squad

Out on loan

Transfers

In

Out

Pre-season and friendlies

Competitions

Overall record

Ligue 1

League table

Results summary

Results by round

Matches
The league fixtures were announced on 25 June 2021.

Coupe de France

Statistics

Appearances and goals

Last updated 21 May 2022.

|-
! colspan=14 style=background:#dcdcdc; text-align:center| Goalkeepers

|-

! colspan=14 style=background:#dcdcdc; text-align:center| Defenders

|-

! colspan=14 style=background:#dcdcdc; text-align:center| Midfielders

|-

! colspan=14 style=background:#dcdcdc; text-align:center| Forwards

|}

Top scorers
Includes all competitive matches. The list is sorted by squad number when total goals are equal.

Last updated 21 May 2022.

Cleansheets
Includes all competitive matches. The list is sorted by squad number when total cleansheets are equal.

Last updated 21 May 2022.

Disciplinary record
Includes all competitive matches.

Last updated 21 May 2022.

References

Stade Brestois 29 seasons
Brest